Manor Street Elementary School, also known as Manor Street School, is a historic elementary school building located at Columbia in Lancaster County, Pennsylvania. It was built in 1895, and is a 2 1/2-story brick building on a stone foundation.  It has a cross-axial plan with a two-story main section flanked by two-story wings in the east and west sides. The front facade features a three-story tower with frame bell tower.

It was listed on the National Register of Historic Places in 1987.

References 

School buildings on the National Register of Historic Places in Pennsylvania
Educational institutions established in 1895
Schools in Lancaster County, Pennsylvania
1895 establishments in Pennsylvania
National Register of Historic Places in Lancaster County, Pennsylvania